Königsegg-Aulendorf was a county of southeastern Baden-Württemberg, Germany. It was created in 1622 as a baronial partition of the Barony of Königsegg, and it was raised to a county in 1629.

By 1806, the territories of Königsegg-Aulendorf were four separate exclaves, centred on Königsegg in the west, Aulendorf in the east, and two smaller territories (north and south) of the Teutonic Knights' territory at Altshausen. Königsegg-Aulendorf was mediatised to the Kingdom of Württemberg in 1806.

Baron of Königsegg-Aulendorf (1622–29) 
 John George (1622–1629)

Counts of Königsegg-Aulendorf (1629–1806) 
John George (1629–1666)
Anthony Eusebius (1666–1692)
Francis Maximilian (1692–1710)
Charles Siegfried (1710–1765)
Herman Frederick (1765–1786)
Ernest (1786–1803)
Francis (1803–1806)

Mediatized Counts of Königsegg-Aulendorf (1806–present) 

  Francis, 7th Count 1803-1863 (1787-1863)
 Gustav, 8th Count 1863-1882 (1813-1882) 
  Alfred, 9th Count 1882-1898 (1817-1898)
  Xaver, 10th Count 1898-1927 (1858-1927)
  Joseph Erwin, 11th Count 1927-1951 (1891-1951)
  Johannes, 12th Count 1951–2020 (1925-2020)
  Maximilian, 13th Count 2020-present (b. 1958)
 Count Philipp, Hereditary Count of Königsegg-Aulendorf (b. 1988)
  Count Nikolaus (b. 1990)
  Count Markus (b. 1963)
 Count Constantin (b. 1993)
  Count Géza (b. 1998)

References 

1622 establishments in the Holy Roman Empire
Counties of the Holy Roman Empire